Metaliomys is an extinct genus of Heteromyidae that existed in the United States during the Late Miocene period. The only species is Metaliomys sevierensis.

References

Heteromyidae
Miocene rodents
Fossil taxa described in 2010
Extinct mammals of North America
Prehistoric monotypic mammal genera